The Shaheen-II (Urdu:شاهين–اا; codename: Hatf–VI Shaheen) is a Pakistani land-based supersonic surface-to-surface medium-range guided ballistic missile. The Shaheen-II is designed and developed by the NESCOM  and the National Defence Complex (NDC) of Pakistan.  The Shaheen missile series is named after a falcon that lives in the mountains of Pakistan.

US Air Force National Air and Space Intelligence Center estimates that as of June 2017 fewer than 50 launchers were operationally deployed.

Description
The Shaheen-II is a longer ranged variant of the Shaheen-I missile. It was the most advanced ballistic missile in service until shaheen III with the Pakistan Armed Forces. It uses a two-stage solid-fuel rocket  motor designed to carry conventional or nuclear payloads. It is transported and launched by a 6-axle transporter erector launcher (TEL). According to U.S. based analysts, a satellite image of a Pakistani missile production facility taken on 5 June 2005 shows fifteen 6-axle TELs being fitted out for the Shaheen 2 missile.

It is a two-stage rocket with diameter of 1.4 m, length of 17.5 m, weight of 25 tons and a range of 2,000 km. Shaheen-II was successfully test fired for the first time on 9 March 2004 and again on 13 November 2014.

Re-entry vehicle
The re-entry vehicle carried by the Shaheen-II missile has a mass of 700–1250 kg, which includes the mass of a nuclear warhead and a terminal guidance system.

This re-entry vehicle is unlike that of the Shaheen I in that it has four moving delta control fins at the rear and small solid/liquid-propellant side thrust motors, which are used to orient the re-entry vehicle after the booster stage is depleted or before re-entry to improve accuracy by providing stabilization during the terminal phase. This can also be used to fly evasive manoeuvres, making it problematic for existing anti-ballistic missile (ABM) systems to successfully intercept the missile. The Shaheen II warhead may change its trajectory several times during re-entry and during the terminal phase, effectively preventing ABM radar systems from pre-calculating intercept points. The re-entry vehicle is also stated to utilise a GPS satellite guidance system to provide updates on its position, further improving its accuracy and reducing the CEP.

Foreign sources claim the missile to have an accuracy of 350 m CEP based on speculation that the design is the same or similar to one of several Chinese systems such as the DF-11 or DF-25. However, according to a press video shown by NDC at the IDEAS 2004 defence exhibition in Pakistan, the missile can achieve "surgical precision". This has led to speculation that Shaheen II incorporates a satellite navigation update system and/or a post separation attitude correction system to provide terminal course correction, which "may indicate a CEP of much less than 300 m." According to Harsh Pant, reader of international relations at the Defence Studies Department of King's College London, "the current capability of Pakistani missiles is built around radar seekers."

Future developments
Since deployment of the 2750 km range Shaheen-III, a multiple independently targeted re-entry vehicle (MIRV) system was assumed to be in development.

See also
Related developments
 Shaheen-I
 Shaheen-III
Related lists
 List of missiles of Pakistan
 Medium-range ballistic missile

References

External links 
 Pakistan’s Long Range Ballistic Missiles: A View From IDEAS
 Pakistani nuclear forces, 2006
 Ghaznavi / Shaheen-II - Pakistan Missile Special Weapons Delivery Systems
 How 'Shaheen' Was Developed

Medium-range ballistic missiles of Pakistan
Military equipment introduced in the 2010s